West Coast Shoe Company, commonly known as Wesco, is an American manufacturer of men's and women's boots based in Scappoose, Oregon.  The company was founded in 1918 and still manufactures all its boots in the United States.  Wesco is especially known for making work boots used by linemen, loggers, wildland firefighters, bikers, and other rugged outdoor use.

References

External links
 Official company website

Clothing companies established in 1918
Scappoose, Oregon
Privately held companies based in Oregon
1918 establishments in Oregon